The 1960 Australian Tourist Trophy was a motor race for sports cars, staged at the Longford Circuit in Tasmania, Australia on Monday, 7 March 1960. It was the fourth in a sequence of annual Australian Tourist Trophy races, with each of these being recognized by the Confederation of Australian Motor Sport as the Australian Championship for sports cars.

The race was won by Derek Jolly driving a Lotus 15.

Results

Notes
 Attendance: 12,000
 Pole position: Ron Phillips
 Starters: 22
 Race distance: 24 laps – 108 miles
 Race time of winning car: 69 minutes 20 seconds
 Fastest lap: Derek Jolly & Doug Whiteford – 2 minutes 50 seconds, (95.29 m.p.h., a sportcar record)

References

External links
 1960 Australian Tourist Trophy…, primotipo.com
 Start of the 1960 Australian Tourist Trophy, aussieroadracing.homestead.com, as archived at web.archive.org
 1960 race images, www.oldracephotos.com

Australian Tourist Trophy
Tourist Trophy
Motorsport in Tasmania